Great Thorness is a settlement in the civil parish of Calbourne, Newtown and Porchfield, on the Isle of Wight, off the south coast of England.

The hamlet lies near the north-west coast of the island and Thorness Bay.

Hamlets on the Isle of Wight